Peninsula Depot is a Cuyahoga Valley Scenic Railroad train station in Peninsula, Ohio. It is located adjacent to Mill Road near Streetsboro Road (Ohio State Route 303) in the Cuyahoga Valley National Park.

History

Initially a stop on the Valley Railway, trains began regular service at Peninsula in 1880. The original station building was destroyed in a fire in the 1960s. It was replaced with the depot formerly located in the village of Boston, which was moved to Peninsula in 1968. The building may be the only surviving combination station from the Valley Railway.

References

Cuyahoga Valley Scenic Railroad stations
Former Baltimore and Ohio Railroad stations
Former railway stations in Ohio
Railway stations in the United States opened in 1880